Bella Vista is a city in Corrientes Province, Argentina. It is the capital of the Bella Vista Department.
The city is near the Paraná river. The city is a popular tourist spot in the summertime.

Location
The small village is located somewhat far from the provincial capital Corrientes and 891 km from Buenos Aires.

See also

Bella Vista (disambiguation)

External links
 Bella Vista Federal website
  Municipal website
  Museum
  Library

Populated places in Corrientes Province
Cities in Argentina
Argentina
Corrientes Province